Chhapra Magarvi is a village in the Ghanghata tehsil of Sant Kabir Nagar district in the Uttar Pradesh state in India.

See also
 Ghanghata
 Sant Kabir Nagar district

References

General
 India Govt. data
 Govt. Website for Sant Kabir Nagar

Villages in Sant Kabir Nagar district